Cutimbo (possibly from Quechua for giant armadillo) is an archaeological site with stone tombs (chullpa) and cave paintings in Peru.

It is located in the Puno Region, Puno Province, Pichacani District. The site was declared a National Cultural Heritage (Patrimonio Cultural) of Peru by the National Institute of Culture.

See also 
 Inca Uyo
 Inka Tunuwiri
 Kenko, Puno
 Mallkuamaya
 Molloko

References 

Archaeological sites in Puno Region
Archaeological sites in Peru
Rock art in South America
Tombs in Peru